Discography is a compilation album by American rock band Jesuit. Released on April 12, 2011, through Magic Bullet Records, the album features every song recorded by the hardcore punk group during their tenure in the mid and late 1990s. Jesuit released a demo tape, two self-titled EPs, and a Black Sabbath cover before disbanding.

In 2021, Discography was reissued by Dark Operative for Jesuit's 25th anniversary.

Reception 

Shawn Macomber of Decibel magazine awarded the album a 9 out of 10 rating, describing it as "a beautifully remastered collection documenting the all-too-fleeting existence of one of the seminal bands that made post-post-hardcore's mid-'90s vicious turn so darkly exhilarating." Writing for RVA Magazine, Marilyn Drew Necci said "Jesuit’s music stands the test of time better than the vast majority of their contemporaries" and that "the remastering job also aids the songs immeasurably". Bob, staff writer for the online magazine Scene Point Blank, said "the lack of any real mention by the current hardcore crowd (be it listeners, bands, media, etc) has rendered [Jesuit] a true overlooked powerhouse". He gave Discography a rating of 8.5 out of 10, calling it "one hell of a release (bordering on 'should be classic') that needs to be heard just short of immediately."

In a less favorable review, Joseph Schafer of Invisible Oranges wrote "the only reason [Discography] exists in this compiled and remastered form, gorgeous artwork and all, is because bassist Nate Newton and guitarist Brian Benoit went on to join Converge and The Dillinger Escape Plan, respectively." He called the cover of Black Sabbath's "Hole in the Sky" the "best song" on the album, and said "after listening to it, I'd put money down that Converge and Dillinger's track record of incredible covers originates from Benoit and Newton."

Track listing

Personnel 
Discography personnel as listed in CD liner notes.

Jesuit
 Brian Benoit – guitar (tracks 1–4)
 J. How – drums
 Brett Matthews – vocals, bass
 Nate Newton – vocals, guitar
 Kelly Posadas – vocals, guitar (tracks 5–12)

Additional musicians
 Jacob Bannon – backing vocals on Jesuit (1999)

Production and recording history
 Kurt Ballou – tracks 1–4 recorded at God City 2 in the winter of 1998; tracks 5–9 recorded at God City 1 on September 2, 1996; tracks 1–12 remixed at God City 4 in the winter of 2006
 Bob Gurske – tracks 10–12 recorded at Wintersound
 Jeff Lipton – tracks 1–12 remastered at Peerless Mastering on January 4, 2007
 Jessica Thompson – tracks 1–12 remastered at Peerless Mastering on January 4, 2007

Artwork and packaging
 Florian Bertmer – cover art illustration
 Brent Eyestoen – layout and design, photographs
 Jason Hellman – photographs
 Dave Mandel – photographs
 Jay Newman – photographs
 Mike Dailey – photographs
 Mike Haley – photographs
 Nate Newton – photographs
 Kelly Posadas – photographs
 Brett Mathews – photographs
 "Various friends and roadies along the way" – photographs

References

External links
Discography at Bandcamp (streamed copy where licensed)

2011 compilation albums
Jesuit (band) albums
Albums produced by Kurt Ballou